Terry Alvin Doughty (born January 16, 1959) is the Chief United States district judge of the United States District Court for the Western District of Louisiana. Nominated by President Donald Trump, Doughty previously served in the Fifth Judicial District Court in Louisiana.

Biography

Doughty was born on January 16, 1959, in Rayville in Richland Parish in northeastern Louisiana. He received his Bachelor of Science in finance from Louisiana Tech University and his Juris Doctor from the Louisiana State University Law School.

State judicial service

As a judge, Doughty presided over criminal, civil, and juvenile cases arising in the parishes of Franklin, Richland, and West Carroll. Elected in 2008 to serve as a judge of the Fifth Judicial District in Louisiana, he replaced retiring Judge Glenn W. Strong. He assumed that office on January 1, 2009.

In 2015, Doughty was re-elected to the court and received the Citizen Lawyer Award from the Louisiana State Bar Association. From 1985 through 2008, Doughty served as an assistant district attorney for the Fifth Judicial District. During that period, he prosecuted misdemeanor and felony cases, and litigated post-conviction proceedings and juvenile cases. Prior to joining the district attorney's office, he practiced at the Rayville firm of Cotton, Bolton, Hoychick & Doughty. Doughty retired from the state bench on March 8, 2018.

Federal judicial service

On August 3, 2017, President Donald Trump nominated Doughty to serve as a United States District Judge of the United States District Court for the Western District of Louisiana, to the seat vacated by Judge Robert G. James, who assumed senior status on May 31, 2016. On November 1, 2017, a hearing on his nomination was held before the Senate Judiciary Committee. On December 7, 2017, his nomination was reported out of committee by a voice vote. On March 1, 2018, the United States Senate invoked cloture on his nomination by a 94–2 vote. Doughty's nomination was confirmed by the Senate on March 6, 2018 by a 98–0 vote. He received his commission on March 7, 2018. He became chief judge on December 5, 2022.

The nomination was endorsed by U.S. Representative Ralph Abraham of Louisiana's 5th congressional district, who like Doughty resides in Richland Parish, and U.S. Senators Bill Cassidy and John Neely Kennedy. Doughty was rated "well qualified" by the American Bar Association.

Block on COVID-19 vaccine mandate 
In 2021, Doughty issued a nationwide injunction against a federal mandate that health care workers be vaccinated against COVID-19. Doughty's opinion includes many false and misleading claims about COVID-19 vaccines, including an incorrect suggestion that vaccines are not useful because booster shots are recommended after six months, a misleading statement that vaccines "do not prevent transmission of the disease", and the falsehood that "the virus has achieved an immune escape from COVID-19 vaccines". Doughty's opinion uncritically invoked the views of a doctor who is a known for making false claims about the COVID-19 vaccine.

On New Year's Day 2022, Doughty issued an injunction on a federal mandate that would require workers at Head Start (a pre-K program) to be vaccinated from COVID-19. Doughty's ruling applied to the 24 states whose Attorneys General signed on to the lawsuit. 

On September 21, 2022, Doughty entered a permanent injunction against a federal vaccine and mask mandate for the Head Start program in 24 states, which would have required its teachers, contractors, and volunteers to be fully vaccinated, stating that Biden did not have constitutional authority to issue such mandate.

References

External links

 
 

|-

1959 births
Living people
20th-century American lawyers
21st-century American lawyers
21st-century American judges
Judges of the United States District Court for the Western District of Louisiana
Louisiana lawyers
Louisiana state court judges
Louisiana State University Law Center alumni
Louisiana Tech University alumni
People from Rayville, Louisiana
United States district court judges appointed by Donald Trump